Wheatsville Co-op is a community-owned food cooperative in Austin, Texas, near the campus of the University of Texas at Austin. Named after the displaced black neighborhood of Wheatville, it was founded in 1976, and as of December 2022, has over 26,000 owners.  It sells a full line of groceries, including organic produce, fresh meats, deli products, dairy products, pet foods and household goods, with an emphasis on local goods.

See also
 List of food cooperatives

References 

Food cooperatives in the United States
Consumers' cooperatives in the United States